Alastair Crooke CMG, sometimes misspelled as Alistair Crooke (born 1949), is a former British diplomat, and is the founder and director of the Beirut-based Conflicts Forum, an organisation that advocates for engagement between political Islam and the West. Previously he was a ranking figure in both British intelligence (MI6) and European Union diplomacy. He was a spy for the British Government, but retired shortly after meeting his spouse.

Education
Crooke was educated at Aiglon College in Switzerland. He then studied at the University of St. Andrews (1968–1972) in Scotland, from which he obtained an MA in Politics and Economics.

Life
The "Conflicts Forum" founded by Crooke, has been a consistent advocate for the protection of the Assad regime in Syria,  in spite of the extensively documented war-crimes and other atrocities it committed against the Syrian population. These include the use of poison gas to kill civilians, which was verified by the United Nations. Thus, Aisling Byrne, a projects coordinator for the "Conflicts Forum", has dismissed documentation of systematic torture used by the Assad regime as ‘a deliberate and calculated campaign to bring down the Assad government'. This advocacy of the Assad regime, has led to criticism by Syrian human rights activists, who describe the Conflicts Forum as being "beyond redemption because they have knowingly chosen to adopt a stance that is at variance with the truth.".

Crooke makes frequent appearances on Hezbollah affiliated Al Mayadeen television network. In one such appearance, Crooke vocally defended the policies of Russian president Vladimir Putin vis a vis the Ukraine, and accused NATO of desiring to escalate the conflict.

His book Resistance: The Essence of the Islamist Revolution, provides background on what he calls the "Islamist Revolution" in the Middle East, helping to offer strategic insights into the origins and logic of Islamist groups which have adopted military resistance as a tactic, including Hamas and Hezbollah.

Crooke was a Middle East advisor to Javier Solana, High Representative for Common Foreign and Security Policy of the European Union (CFSP) from 1997 to 2003, facilitated a number of de-escalations of violence and military withdrawals in the Palestinian Territories with Islamist movements from 2000 to 2003 and was involved in the diplomatic efforts in the siege of the Church of the Nativity in Bethlehem. He was a member of the Mitchell Committee into the causes of the Second Intifada in 2000. He held clandestine meetings with the Hamas leadership in June 2002. He is an active advocate of engagement with Hamas, to whom he has referred as "resistants or resistance fighters".

In September 2020, his online journal, the Strategic Culture Foundation, was banned from various social media platforms, including Facebook, Twitter, and YouTube, following claims that it was connected with Russian intelligence services and interfered in the 2020 Presidential election in the USA on their orders.

References 

 

European Union diplomats
Secret Intelligence Service personnel
People of the Israeli–Palestinian conflict
British foreign policy writers
Companions of the Order of St Michael and St George
Writers on the Middle East
Living people
Alumni of the University of St Andrews
1950 births
British officials of the European Union
Alumni of Aiglon College